The ITU-WHO Focus Group on Artificial Intelligence for Health (AI for Health) is an inter-agency collaboration between the World Health Organization and the ITU, which created a benchmarking framework to assess the accuracy of AI in health. 

This organization convenes an international network of experts and stakeholders from fields like research, practice, regulation, ethics, public health, etc, that develops guideline documentation and code. The documents address ethics, assessment/evaluation, handling, and regulation of AI for health solutions, covering specific use cases including AI in ophthalmology, histopathology, dentistry, malaria detection, radiology, symptom checker applications, etc. FG-AI4H has established an ad hoc group concerned with digital technologies for health emergencies, including COVID-19. All documentation is public.

The idea for the Focus Group came out of the Health Track of the 2018 AI for Good Global Summit. Administratively, FG-AI4H was created by ITU-T Study Group 16. Under ITU-T's framework, participation in Focus Groups is open to anyone from an ITU Member State. The secretariat is provided by the Telecommunication Standardization Bureau (under Director Chaesub Lee). It was first created at the July 2018 meeting with a lifetime of two years, at the July 2020 meeting this was extended for another two years, where the focus group also submitted its deliverables to its parent body. It was also presented at the NeurIPS 2020 health workshop.

The outline of the benchmarking framework was published in a commentary in The Lancet as: WHO and ITU establish benchmarking process for artificial intelligence in health

Overview
The benchmarking framework is structured in a cyclical fashion that denoted the continuous improvement nature of AI in health models.

Deliverables
The specifications drawn up by FG-AI4H are titled as:
 AI4H ethics considerations
 AI4H regulatory [best practices | considerations]
 AI4H requirements specification
 AI software life cycle specification
 Data specification
 AI training best practices specification
 AI4H evaluation considerations
 AI4H scale-up and adoption
 AI4H applications and platforms
 Use cases of the ITU-WHO Focus Group on AI for Health

An overview of the schematic relations is provided as depicted below.

See also
World Health Organization (WHO)
ITU Telecommunication Standardization Sector
Artificial intelligence in healthcare
Digital health
Artificial Intelligence
Machine Learning

References

External links 
 FG-AI4H main site
Open Code Initiative

World Health Organization
International Telecommunication Union